LAN Chile Flight 1069 was an aircraft accident at Puerto Williams Airport in Chile on February 20, 1991. The regional flight from Punta Arenas Airport, approximately  distant, overran the runway on arrival at Puerto Williams, killing 20 of the 66 passengers. All 6 crew members survived.

The accident 
The flight departed Punta Arenas normally at 14:51 hours local time, with no significant issues. At 15:15, the aircraft was cleared for a VOR A approach into Puerto Williams Airport on runway 26. Then the captain decided to perform a direct approach to runway 08. This was approved by air traffic control. Then, the aircraft overran the runway and slid into the Beagle Channel.

The aircraft
The aircraft was a Avro RJ85/BAe 146-200  registered as CC-CET. The aircraft was 4 years and 6 months old.

Cause 
The accident with the aircraft was caused by a failure of good planning made by the pilot during the approach when he decided to change runway and misapplication of the landing procedure. The weather conditions, negative slope, wet runway, wind and little braking action led to the overrun of the runway.

References

External links 
 

Airliner accidents and incidents caused by pilot error
Accidents and incidents involving the British Aerospace 146
Aviation accidents and incidents in 1991
Aviation accidents and incidents in Chile
1069
History of Tierra del Fuego
History of Magallanes Region
1991 in Chile
Presidency of Patricio Aylwin
1991 disasters in Chile